John Arthur Lawton  (19 January 1913 - 29 April 1995) was the Archdeacon of Warrington from 1970 until 1981.

Lawton was educated at Rugby, Fitzwilliam College, Cambridge  and Ripon College Cuddesdon;  and ordained in 1938. He was a Curate at  St Dunstan, Edgehill (1937–40); Vicar of St Anne Wigan  (1940–56), St Luke, Southport  (1956–60) and Kirkby  (1960–69); and Canon Diocesan of Liverpool (1963–87).

Notes

1913 births
People educated at Rugby School
Alumni of Fitzwilliam College, Cambridge
Alumni of Ripon College Cuddesdon
Archdeacons of Warrington
1995 deaths